Pascolizumab is a humanized monoclonal antibody for the treatment of asthma. A Phase II clinical trial in patients with symptomatic glucocorticoid naive asthma has been conducted in 2001/2002.

References 

Monoclonal antibodies
Experimental drugs